This is a list of radio stations in the state of Tabasco, Mexico.

Defunct stations 
 XENAC-AM 1440, Nacajuca
 XHACM-FM 104.5, Cárdenas

Notes

References 

Tabasco